Lespedeza repens, common names creeping lespedeza, creeping bush-clover, and trailing lespedeza, is a plant native to the United States. It is listed as a species of special concern in Connecticut and as rare in New York. It is a perennial herb which blooms May to September. Its habitats include open woods, clearings, and thickets.

References

Flora of the United States
replens